Confidence Man is the first solo album by Matt Pryor, frontman for the New Amsterdams and Get Up Kids.

Recording
The album was written, produced, and recorded at Pryor's home studio in Lawrence, Kansas. The first single off the album, entitled "Lorelai" was made available on Pryor's Myspace page. The album stemmed from Pryor's desire to write an album before he turned 30, to write and record an album by himself completely.

Track listing

Personnel
Matt Pryor - vocals, guitar, percussion, piano, production
Colin Mahoney - mixing
Joe Montgomery - photography

References

External links
Billboard.com: Album Review

2008 debut albums
Matt Pryor (musician) albums
Vagrant Records albums